Ivan Bakhar (born 10 July 1998) is a Belarusian footballer who plays for Ironi Kiryat Shmona.

Ironi Kiryat Shmona F.C.
Bakhar signed for Ironi Kiryat Shmona F.C. on December 2022.
He scored his first goal for Ironi Kiryat Shmona in a 2-2 draw against Hapoel Hadera on January 14, 2023.

References

External links

Profile at pressball.by

1998 births
Living people
Belarusian footballers
Association football forwards
Association football wingers
Belarus international footballers
Belarusian expatriate footballers
Expatriate footballers in Israel
FC Minsk players
FC Dinamo Minsk players
Hapoel Ironi Kiryat Shmona F.C. players